Talish or Talish-i may refer to:

Talish (region)
Talish people
Talish-i Gushtasbi, Azerbaijan
Aruch, (until 1970 Talish), a village in Armenia
Talish, Tartar, village in Nagorno-Karabakh

Surname

Agha Talish, a Pakistani actor
Aehsun Talish (son)
Raza Talish (grandson)

See also
Talesh (disambiguation)
Talış (disambiguation)
Talysh (disambiguation)